The Mott School and Second Street School are historic former school buildings in Trenton, New Jersey.  Together they cover the continuum of education in the area.  The Second Street School, formerly known as the Nottingham Township School, was built in 1854 when public education was voluntary and non-standardized.  The Mott School was built in stages from 1876-1911 during the era of institutionalization and centralization of public schooling.  It continued in use until 1980.

Gallery

See also
National Register of Historic Places listings in Mercer County, New Jersey

References

Defunct schools in New Jersey
National Register of Historic Places in Trenton, New Jersey
New Jersey Register of Historic Places